Navithanveli is a small town in Sri Lanka. It is located within Eastern Province.

References

External links

Towns in Ampara District
Navithanveli DS Division